TPC Deere Run is an 18-hole golf course in the central United States, located in Silvis, Illinois, along the Rock River.  It is operated by the PGA Tour as a member of their Tournament Players Club network of golf courses and plays host to the annual John Deere Classic, part of the tour's regular season schedule. It is usually held in July, the week preceding The Open.

TPC Deere Run was designed as a stadium course by D. A. Weibring Golf Resources, in association with PGA TOUR Design Services, and plays  to a par of 71 from the championship tees.

The course record is 59, shot by Paul Goydos in the opening round of the John Deere Classic in 2010.

Scorecard

References

External links 

John Deere Classic

Golf clubs and courses in Illinois
Buildings and structures in Rock Island County, Illinois
Sports venues in the Quad Cities
Tourist attractions in Rock Island County, Illinois